Chiauci is a comune (municipality) in the Province of Isernia in the Italian region Molise, located about  northwest of Campobasso and about  northeast of Isernia.

Chiauci borders the following municipalities: Civitanova del Sannio, Pescolanciano, Pietrabbondante, Sessano del Molise.

References

External links
 Official website

Cities and towns in Molise